George Washington Lay (July 26, 1798 – October 21, 1860) was an American politician and diplomat who served as a U.S. Representative from New York and Charge D'Affaires to Sweden.

Born in Catskill, New York, Lay pursued classical studies and graduated in 1817 from Hamilton College in Clinton, New York.  He studied law with Phineas L. Tracy, attained admission to the bar in 1820, and commenced practice with in Batavia, New York as Tracy's partner.

Lay served as Treasurer of Genesee County from 1825 to 1831.

He was elected as an Anti-Masonic Party candidate to the Twenty-third Congress and reelected as an Anti-Jacksonian to the Twenty-fourth Congress (March 4, 1833 – March 3, 1837).  In 1835 he received the honorary degree of Master of Arts from Yale University.

Lay later became a Whig, and served as member of the New York State Assembly in 1840.  He was Charge D'Affaires to Sweden from May 12, 1842, to October 29, 1845.

He died in Batavia on October 21, 1860.  He was interred in Batavia Cemetery.

Sources

1798 births
1860 deaths
People from Greene County, New York
Anti-Masonic Party members of the United States House of Representatives from New York (state)
19th-century American politicians
New York (state) National Republicans
National Republican Party members of the United States House of Representatives
New York (state) Whigs
Members of the New York State Assembly
Hamilton College (New York) alumni
New York (state) lawyers
19th-century American diplomats
Burials in New York (state)
People from Catskill, New York
19th-century American lawyers